Coraebus is a genus of beetles in the family Buprestidae, containing the following species:

 Coraebus aculeatus Ganglbauer, 1890
 Coraebus acutus Thomson, 1879
 Coraebus aeneopictus (Kerremans, 1895)
 Coraebus aequalipennis Fairmaire, 1888
 Coraebus aesopus Kerremans, 1913
 Coraebus akiyamai Kubán, 1997
 Coraebus albivestitus Bellamy, 1991
 Coraebus aldo Kubán, 1996
 Coraebus amabilis Kerremans, 1895
 Coraebus amamianus Kurosawa, 1985
 Coraebus amplithorax (Fairmaire, 1889)
 Coraebus andreorum Kubán, 1996
 Coraebus andrewesi Obenberger, 1922
 Coraebus annamensis Descarpentries & Villiers, 1967
 Coraebus anniae Obenberger, 1928
 Coraebus auberti Théry, 1923
 Coraebus auriventris Kerremans, 1912
 Coraebus aurofasciatus (Hope, 1831)
 Coraebus baoshanensis Kubán, 1996
 Coraebus battareli Descarpentries & Villiers, 1967
 Coraebus baylei Bourgoin, 1922
 Coraebus becvari Kubán, 1995
 Coraebus bilyi Kubán, 1996
 Coraebus bilyianus Kubán, 1995
 Coraebus binhensis Descarpentries & Villiers, 1967
 Coraebus bivestitus Bellamy, 1991
 Coraebus blandus Akiyama & Ohmomo, 1989
 Coraebus blaoensis Descarpentries & Villiers, 1967
 Coraebus borneensis Kerremans, 1912
 Coraebus bunun Miwa & Chûjô, 1940
 Coraebus cavifrons Descarpentries & Villiers, 1967
 Coraebus cervenkai Kubán, 1995
 Coraebus chapensis Descarpentries & Villiers, 1967
 Coraebus chrysogaster Kurosawa, 1953
 Coraebus chucki Kubán, 1997
 Coraebus cingulatus (Hope, 1831)
 Coraebus circularis Kerremans, 1888
 Coraebus cisseiformis Obenberger, 1913
 Coraebus clermonti Bourgoin, 1924
 Coraebus cloueti Théry, 1895
 Coraebus coelestiofulgens Akiyama & Ohmomo, 1993
 Coraebus coelestis Saunders, 1874
 Coraebus coeruleus Kerremans, 1892
 Coraebus collaris Gory & Laporte, 1839
 Coraebus conjunctus Deyrolle, 1864
 Coraebus conspicuus Thomson, 1878
 Coraebus coomani Descarpentries & Villiers, 1967
 Coraebus cornutus Deyrolle, 1864
 Coraebus corporaali Obenberger, 1932
 Coraebus cupreosplendens Akiyama, 1989
 Coraebus cupricollis Deyrolle, 1864
 Coraebus cyaneopictus Kerremans, 1892
 Coraebus daisenensis Miwa, 1940
 Coraebus davidis Fairmaire, 1886
 Coraebus delepinei Baudon, 1960
 Coraebus delicatus Kerremans, 1895
 Coraebus dembickyi Kubán, 1995
 Coraebus demonstratus Kubán, 1995
 Coraebus denticollis Saunders, 1866
 Coraebus dessumi Descarpentries & Villiers, 1967
 Coraebus diminutus Gebhardt, 1928
 Coraebus disponsae Baudon, 1968
 Coraebus disponsi Baudon, 1962
 Coraebus duodecimpunctatus Obenberger, 1940
 Coraebus elatus (Fabricius, 1787)
 Coraebus elegantissimus Akiyama, 1989
 Coraebus elongaticollis Akiyama & Ohmomo, 1993
 Coraebus elongatus Peng, 1998
 Coraebus embriki Obenberger, 1932
 Coraebus fallaciosus Bourgoin, 1925
 Coraebus fasciatus (Villers, 1789)
 Coraebus femina Kubán, 1997
 Coraebus fokienicus Obenberger, 1940
 Coraebus formosanus Miwa & Chûjô, 1935
 Coraebus francoisi Baudon, 1968
 Coraebus frater Bourgoin, 1925
 Coraebus fukamachii Akiyama, 1987
 Coraebus fulgidus Obenberger, 1916
 Coraebus gagneuxi Baudon, 1963
 Coraebus gestroi Kerremans, 1892
 Coraebus gorkai Gebhardt, 1928
 Coraebus gorkaianus Kubán, 1997
 Coraebus grisator (Gory & Laporte, 1839)
 Coraebus guangxiensis Peng, 1998
 Coraebus hastanus Gory & Laporte, 1839
 Coraebus hauseri Obenberger, 1930
 Coraebus herychi Obenberger, 1940
 Coraebus hewitti Kerremans, 1912
 Coraebus holzschuhi Kubán, 1996
 Coraebus honza Kubán, 1995
 Coraebus horaki Kubán, 1995
 Coraebus hoscheki Gebhardt, 1928
 Coraebus houianus Kubán, 1995
 Coraebus hovorkai Kubán, 1997
 Coraebus ignifrons Fairmaire, 1895
 Coraebus ignotus Saunders, 1873
 Coraebus inornatus Kerremans, 1912
 Coraebus insignis Kerremans, 1898
 Coraebus insulicolus Kerremans, 1912
 Coraebus intemeratus Obenberger, 1940
 Coraebus iriei Kurosawa, 1985
 Coraebus ishiharai Kurosawa, 1953
 Coraebus jeanvoinei Descarpentries & Villiers, 1967
 Coraebus jedlickai Obenberger, 1934
 Coraebus jelineki Descarpentries & Villiers, 1967
 Coraebus jendeki Kubán, 1997
 Coraebus jiangxiensis Peng, 1989
 Coraebus karenorum Kubán, 1995
 Coraebus kerremansi Théry, 1926
 Coraebus kiangsuanus Obenberger, 1934
 Coraebus kiyoshii Akiyama, 1989
 Coraebus klapaleki Obenberger, 1924
 Coraebus klickai Obenberger, 1930
 Coraebus komiyai Akiyama, 1988
 Coraebus kubani Peng, 1998
 Coraebus kulti Obenberger, 1940
 Coraebus kurosawai Akiyama, 1988
 Coraebus laportei Saunders, 1871
 Coraebus larminati Kubán, 1995
 Coraebus lepidulus Obenberger, 1940
 Coraebus lesnei Bourgoin, 1922
 Coraebus leucospilotus Bourgoin, 1922
 Coraebus levasseuri Bourgoin, 1925
 Coraebus lienhwachiensis Akiyama, 1988
 Coraebus linnei Obenberger, 1922
 Coraebus longipennis Deyrolle, 1864
 Coraebus loochooensis Kano, 1929
 Coraebus lubopetri Kubán, 1995
 Coraebus maculifer Abeille de Perrin, 1897
 Coraebus magnus Kerremans, 1898
 Coraebus malabaricus Obenberger, 1922
 Coraebus malayanus Kubán, 1995
 Coraebus meditabundus (Fabricius, 1787)
 Coraebus melancholicus Obenberger, 1932
 Coraebus meliboeoides Bílý, 1983
 Coraebus mianningensis Peng, 1991
 Coraebus mirus Kubán, 1996
 Coraebus modestus Kerremans, 1892
 Coraebus modiglianii Kerremans, 1894
 Coraebus montanus (Fisher, 1935)
 Coraebus moultoni Kerremans, 1912
 Coraebus muehlei Kubán, 1996
 Coraebus muelleri Théry, 1925
 Coraebus natator Kubán, 1996
 Coraebus nigromaculatus Kurosawa, 1953
 Coraebus nikodymi Kubán, 1995
 Coraebus niponicus Lewis, 1894
 Coraebus obscurus Peng, 1991
 Coraebus occidentalis Kubán, 1997
 Coraebus oertzeni Ganglbauer, 1886
 Coraebus olexai Bílý, 1983
 Coraebus orothi (Baudon, 1962)
 Coraebus pacholatkoi Kubán, 1996
 Coraebus pascoei Saunders, 1867
 Coraebus perpulcher Obenberger, 1916
 Coraebus perroti Descarpentries, 1948
 Coraebus perrotianus Descarpentries & Villiers, 1967
 Coraebus petri Kubán, 1996
 Coraebus pickai Kubán, 1995
 Coraebus probstorum Kubán, 1995
 Coraebus pseudoblandus Kubán, 1997
 Coraebus pseudopurpura Kubán, 1997
 Coraebus pulchellus Nonfried, 1895
 Coraebus purkynei Obenberger, 1934
 Coraebus purpura Kubán, 1996
 Coraebus purpuratiformis Kubán, 1995
 Coraebus purpureicollis Gestro, 1877
 Coraebus quadriundulatus Motschulsky, 1866
 Coraebus quangxiensis Peng, 1998
 Coraebus rambouseki Obenberger, 1934
 Coraebus rubi (Linnaeus, 1767)
 Coraebus rugosus Deyrolle, 1864
 Coraebus rusticanus Lewis, 1893
 Coraebus sainvali Kubán, 1997
 Coraebus sakagutii Kurosawa, 1963
 Coraebus salamandra Kubán, 1995
 Coraebus salamandriformis Kubán, 1995
 Coraebus salvazai Bourgoin, 1922
 Coraebus sausai Kubán, 1997
 Coraebus sauteri Kerremans, 1912
 Coraebus semipurpureus Fairmaire, 1889
 Coraebus semiviolaceus Deyrolle, 1864
 Coraebus sericeus Kerremans, 1894
 Coraebus sherpa Kubán, 1996
 Coraebus sidae Kerremans, 1888
 Coraebus simplex Peng, 1991
 Coraebus sinomeridionalis Kubán, 1995
 Coraebus smaragdineus Kerremans, 1892
 Coraebus sonani Miwa & Chûjô, 1935
 Coraebus spathatus (Kerremans, 1892)
 Coraebus spectabiliformis Kubán, 1995
 Coraebus spectabilis Bílý, 1983
 Coraebus spevari Kubán, 1995
 Coraebus splendens Peng, 1998
 Coraebus stichai Obenberger, 1924
 Coraebus strnadianus Kubán, 1995
 Coraebus sumatrensis Kerremans, 1894
 Coraebus suturalis Kerremans, 1893
 Coraebus svaneki Kubán, 1997
 Coraebus svihlai Kubán, 1995
 Coraebus taiwanus Akiyama, 1988
 Coraebus tamensis Descarpentries & Villiers, 1967
 Coraebus tazoei Akiyama, 1988
 Coraebus teres Kubán, 1996
 Coraebus thailandicus Kubán, 1995
 Coraebus theryanus Gebhardt, 1926
 Coraebus thoracellus Kerremans, 1900
 Coraebus torigaii Akiyama & Ohmomo, 1993
 Coraebus tubulosus Kubán, 1997
 Coraebus umphangicus Kubán, 1995
 Coraebus undatus (Fabricius, 1787)
 Coraebus vagepictus Obenberger, 1934
 Coraebus vicarius Kubán, 1995
 Coraebus vientianensis Baudon, 1968
 Coraebus vietnamensis Kubán, 1996
 Coraebus violaceipennis Saunders, 1866
 Coraebus viridimicans Akiyama & Ohmomo, 1993
 Coraebus vuilletae Bourgoin, 1925
 Coraebus wiwuti Ohmomo, 2004
 Coraebus yanshanensis Peng, 1991
 Coraebus yuanyunae Peng, 1998
 Coraebus zhangi Peng, 1989
 Coraebus zhejiangensis Peng, 1998
 Coraebus zonatus Kubán, 1996
 Coraebus zoufali Obenberger, 1930

References

Buprestidae genera